A consulting firm or simply consultancy is a professional service firm that provides expertise and specialised labour for a fee, through the use of consultants. Consulting firms may have one employee or thousands; they may consult in a broad range of domains, for example, management, engineering, and so on.

Management consultants, in particular, typically work with company executives and provide them with generalists and industry-specific specialists, known as subject-matter experts, usually trained in management or in business schools. The deliverable of a management consultant is usually recommendations for achieving a company objective, leading to a company project.

Many consulting firms complement the recommendations with implementation support, either by the consultants or by technicians and other experts. 

Consulting services are part of the tertiary sector and account for several hundred billion dollars in annual revenues. Between 2010 and 2015, the 10 largest consulting firms alone made 170 billion dollars growth revenue and the average annual growth rate is around 4%.

Segments 
The segmentation of advisory services varies widely across organizations and countries. Categorization is unclear, in part because of the upheavals that have occurred in this industry in recent years.

One approach is to separate services into five broad service delivery families, considering the managers they are targeting:
 Services related to the company's overall strategy, which are addressed to the CEO,
 Services related to marketing, communication, sales and public relations, which are addressed to the CMO,
 Services related to management, financial management, taxation, accounting, compliance with regulations, for the CFO,
 Services related to the company's operations, intended for operational management, which may be different depending on the industrial sector (technology director, plant managers, operations directors, Research and Development managers), for instance COO and CTO,
 Service related to information technology (see IT consulting) intended for information management, which are addressed to the CIO.

Types 
There are different types of consulting firms serving different sectors. They mainly fall under the following fields:

 Architecture and Engineering
 Financial services 
 Health care
 Hotel and hospitality industry
 Human resources
 Information technology
 Legal
 Management
 Music
 Regulatory compliance

Some consulting firms also serve niche sectors, such as:

 advertising/marketing/public relations
 environmental consulting
 entertainment/media
 energy
 logistics
 consulting in politics and the public sector
 real estate
 recycling
 small business
 commodities

Models of business 

A consulting firm's model of business is comparable to staffing, wherein the objective is to effectively lower labour costs for clients for an intended result, or relative to an intended result or output, in order to charge for a profit margin for the consulting firm. Clients are essentially looking to procure or purchase external help and assistance. Consulting firms sustain themselves from a labour economic point of view as a method for distributing labour, where certain positions, roles or fields of expertise within the labour market find it more suitable for contract work, as contrasted to in-house employment, for a few conceivable reasons:
 Client needs being incontinuous, or continuous but otherwise volatile in that they may vary from time to time in nature and scope,
 A potential scarcity of skilled labour available on the market, 
 The possibility of offering a higher work level activity,
 The need for licensed labour or otherwise qualified labour for tasks not making up the core task assembly of the client organization,
 Wanting to get a hold of or utilize of 3rd party intellectual property, intangible capital or other types of goodwill belonging to the consulting firm,
consequently acting as a source of profit for clients, consulting firms and society as proffered. As such, the consulting business model can be seen as a result of the knowledge economy, and as a subset of the knowledge industry. Today it is not rare for consulting firms to offer what may be considered turnkey solutions to clients. Knowledge transfer is also a common sales argument for consulting services.

As consulting firms grow larger, in a modern, globalised and interconnected business environment, a lot of times they will take what could be seen as a 3rd party position, as it relates to one or more clients, that are engaged in b2b business. The consulting firm utilises its networking capabilities (due to its high number of clients, often within diverse markets) to connect actors in for example M&A activity. Since the private sector isn't allowed to use officials, nor attempt to create any such equivalent as this would be regarded as antitrust behaviour, there is a natural demand for other such private or business services to offer an alternative to this type of coordinating services.

Outsourcing 
It is common for consulting firms practices to be involved in the selling of outsourcing services as well. Similarly, outsourcing firms may offer consulting services as a way to help integrate their services with the client. Many consulting firms offer several service packages as part of their business portfolio. While consulting services and outsourcing services are compatible, issues arise if the clients are not aware of the differences between the two. From an ethical standpoint, it is important that clients are aware of what type or types of services they're procuring, as consulting services are meant to be a complementary service to the client firm, whereas outsourcing effectively aims to replace parts of the client firm that are imperative to their operational ability.

Successful consulting firm cases

Mexico 
In 2013, there was a randomized trial in Mexico where 432 small and medium enterprises were allowed access to management consulting services for one year. As a result of this trial, there were many positive impacts. Such positive impacts include: increase in entrepreneurial spirit, increases in employment and higher wages for employees. Even after 5 years after the trial, positive impacts are still active. These results were achieved by advertising a consulting program to 432 enterprises and recorded data on the positive effects.

Money laundering in consulting firms 
A consulting firm is a suitable instrument for money laundering. Illegally obtained money is laundered by the employment of consulting companies. The reason consulting firms are so effective at laundering money is because consulting services are immaterial, therefore, pricing is non-transparent.

Another reason consulting firms are effective at laundering money is because sometimes consultants regularly leverage their clients into charging higher prices. When a client of the consulting firm is satisfied, the consultant can charger higher fees through more leverage while setting prices through the contracting prices. Therefore, when auditors inspect financial statements provided by the consulting firm, the consulting firm can state that a certain consulting project costed an 'x' amount of money and auditors are unable to detect fraud, thus allowing money laundering to occur.

Impact of consulting firms in emerging economies

Negative impacts 
The impact of consulting firms on local businesses in emerging economies do not always have positive effects. One reason for this is that firms in emerging economies suffer from the inferiority of their technologies and innovation capabilities, thus, although they have access to consulting firms, they cannot make the most of the advice given. Advice given by consulting firms to clients may not be used efficiently as clients firms in emerging markets tend to suffer due to a lack of infrastructure, organisation, and education. Another reason firms in emerging economies struggle to effectively use consulting services is that innovation is very costly and risky.

Positive impacts 
As noted above, consulting firms in emerging economies do also have positive impacts. Positive impacts include: increases in employment, increase in entrepreneurial spirit and higher wages for employees.

Impact of consulting firms in developed economies 
One study shows that there is a significant difference between efficiency between consulting firms in America (developed economy) and consulting firms in Asia Pacific regions (emerging economy). Efficiency scores of consulting firms in America were significantly higher than consulting firms in Asia Pacific regions. This is because firms in developed economies have better infrastructure, organisation and education, thus advice given by consulting firms is used efficiently.

See also 

 Consulting
 Information technology consulting
 Knowledge economy
 Knowledge industry
 Knowledge intensive business services
 Knowledge transfer
 Management consulting
 Temporary work

References 

 
Knowledge firms
Legal entities